Blue Mesa Observatory (BMO), also referred to Magdalena Peak Station for the International Planetary Patrol Program, was an astronomical observatory owned and operated by New Mexico State University (NMSU). Founded in 1967 under the supervision of Clyde Tombaugh, the observatory was closed in 1993. The site and the  surrounding it were conveyed to the Federal Aviation Administration, which tore down the observatory building and replaced it with a radar installation.

BMO's main telescope was a  Cassegrain reflector built by Astro Mechanics and installed in 1969.  It was equipped with a Boller and Chivens spectrograph, a spectrophotometer, and a photoelectric photometer.  After BMO closed, the telescope and instruments were acquired by Pittsburg State University (PSU) in 1993.  It was installed at the PSU-Greenbush Astrophysical Observatory near Girard, Kansas in 1996.  PSU operates the observatory in cooperation with several local school districts.

See also
 Tortugas Mountain Observatory
 Corralitos Observatory
 Apache Point Observatory
 List of astronomical observatories

References

External links
 Astronomy Department at NMSU

Astronomical observatories in New Mexico
Buildings and structures in Doña Ana County, New Mexico
Defunct astronomical observatories
New Mexico State University
1967 establishments in New Mexico
1993 disestablishments in New Mexico